Glazeley is a civil parish in Shropshire, England.  The parish contains four listed buildings that are recorded in the National Heritage List for England.  All the listed buildings are designated at Grade II, the lowest of the three grades, which is applied to "buildings of national importance and special interest". The parish contains the village of Glazeley and the surrounding countryside, and the listed buildings consist of a house, a milestone, a church, and a war memorial.


Buildings

References

Citations

Sources

Lists of buildings and structures in Shropshire